IndieAuth is an open standard decentralized authentication protocol that uses OAuth 2.0 and enables services to verify the identity of a user represented by a URL as well as to obtain an access token that can be used to access resources under the control of the user.

IndieAuth is developed in the IndieWeb community and was published as a W3C Note. It was published as a W3C Note by the Social Web Working Group due to lacking the time needed to formally progress it to a W3C recommendation, despite having several interoperable implementations.

Implementations 
 WordPress IndieAuth Plugin
 Known
 Micro.blog
 Grav (CMS) IndieAuth Plugin
 Drupal IndieWeb Plugin
 Cellar Door

See also
OpenID
WebID

References

External links
 IndieAuth specification

World Wide Web Consortium standards
Password authentication
Federated identity
Identity management initiative
Computer access control protocols
WordPress